Levantina is a genus of air-breathing land snails, terrestrial pulmonate gastropod mollusks in the subfamily Helicinae of the family Helicidae, the typical snails.

Species
 Levantina asagittata Neubert, 1998
 Levantina asira Neubert, 1998
 Levantina bellardi (Mousson, 1854)
 Levantina caesareana (Mousson, 1854)
 Levantina ceratomma (L. Pfeiffer, 1855)
 Levantina chanzirensis Kobelt, 1906
 Levantina cilicica (Kobelt, 1895)
 Levantina djulfensis (Dubois de Montpéreux, 1840)
 Levantina escheriana (Bourguignat, 1864)
 Levantina guttata (Olivier, 1804)
 Levantina kurdistana (L. Pfeiffer, 1861)
 Levantina lithophaga (Conrad, 1852)
 Levantina longinqua (Schütt & Subai, 1996)
 Levantina mahanica Kobelt, 1910
 Levantina malziana (L. Pfeiffer, 1861)
 Levantina mardinensis Kobelt, 1900
 Levantina naegelei Kobelt, 1901
 Levantina ninivita (Galland, 1885)
 Levantina rechingeri (Fuchs & Käufel, 1936)
 Levantina semitecta Neubert, 1998
 Levantina spiriplana (Olivier, 1801)
 Levantina symensi Neubert, 1998
 Levantina thospitis (Schütt & Subai, 1996)
 Levantina vanensis (Schütt & Subai, 1996)

References

Avec Atlas, vol. 1, p. xii pp. + Évaluation (1 pp.) + 432 pp. + Errata (1 pp.); Atlas, 1st livraison: vii pp., pls 1-17
The conchological collections of Bruguière and Olivier from the Ottoman Empire (1792-1798). Journal of Conchology 31(3): 153-160
 Neubert, E. (1998). Annotated checklist of the terrestrial and freshwater molluscs of the Arabian Peninsula with descriptions of new species. Fauna of Arabia. 17: 333–461.
 Bank, R. A. (2017). Classification of the Recent terrestrial Gastropoda of the World. Last update: July 16, 2017.

Helicidae